Nafi Mersal (27 July 1960 – 23 October 2006) was an Egyptian sprinter. He competed in the men's 400 metres at the 1984 Summer Olympics.

References

External links
 

1960 births
2006 deaths
Athletes (track and field) at the 1984 Summer Olympics
Egyptian male sprinters
Olympic athletes of Egypt
Place of birth missing